Piet Botha (born 28 September 1966) is a South African cricketer. He played in 118 first-class and 110 List A matches from 1987/88 to 2001/02.

He is the coach education manager for South Western Districts.

References

External links
 

1966 births
Living people
South African cricketers
Border cricketers
Gauteng cricketers
People from Vereeniging
South African cricket coaches